Robert Lawson (born 18 May 1927) is a former Australian politician.
Lawson was born in Melbourne to Leonard Langworthy Lawson, a builder, and Alice Dorothy. He attended local state schools and became the managing director of Lawsons Pty Ltd.

Political career 
After joining the Liberal Party in 1950, 
Lawson was elected to the Victorian Legislative Council in 1979 as a member for Higinbotham. 
Lawson was at a event for Mayor Jack Campbell in the 1980's. https://victoriancollections.net.au/items/536301849821f40c64c6d205
He held the seat until his retirement in 1992, the year the Kennett government was brought to government at the Victorian state election.

References

 

1927 births
Possibly living people
Liberal Party of Australia members of the Parliament of Victoria
Members of the Victorian Legislative Council